Fat Bear Week is an annual tournament taking place every October. It pits bears in Katmai National Park, Alaska, against each other in a week-long bracket style competition, evaluating a bear's "success in preparation for winter hibernation". Human spectators  vote to decide who they deem is the "fattest" bear.

Background 
Katmai National Park is home to around 2'200 brown bears which bulk up on salmon throughout the summer and fall in order to accumulate fat and prepare for their annual winter hibernation. These males can eat as much as 120 lbs. of salmon in one day, that can mean catching as many as 30 fish a day.  

At the Katmai National Park, bears generally begin hibernating in October and November. During this long sleep bears do not eat or drink till spring. Hence the need for the profound weight gain before hibernation.  Gaining weight is also crucial for mother bears who are pregnant. Succesfull pregnancies require adequate weight gain from the fall.

History 
Fat Bear Week, founded by former park ranger Mike Fitz, was founded as Fat Bear Tuesday in 2014. He came up with the idea after noting the interest in online livestreams of the bears feeding at the river. Visitors to the national park were asked to review before and after photos of a number of the park's bears and to vote for the fattest bear in a single-elimination tournament. In 2015, the tournament went digital and was extended to a week.

In 2022, officials were forced to discount fraudulent votes in an unprecedented case of voter fraud after irregularities in the semifinals were discovered.

Tournament 
Fat Bear Week takes place every October. The event is organized by the National Park Service and Explore.org, and anyone can participate by voting online for their preferred bear. Voting can be done between 12pm and 9pm Eastern by visiting the Explore.org website for the duration of Fat Bear Week. This is also good spot to watch the webcams along the river. 

In order to qualify for Fat Bear Week, brown bears of the Katmai National Park must have been spotted catching sockeye salmon at the Brooks River. A 1.5 mile section of the river is used  to choose bears to be eligible. This section of river has web cams. Bears must be seen not just in the fall but also summer season as well. 

The subjective contest is a single-elimination tournament. Each day, two bears are presented in a match-up, identified by numbers. The bear with the most votes advances to the next round. In order to evaluate which bears have gained the most weight in preparation for hibernation, the public is able to view before and after photos of specific bears, watch them on livestream feeds, and read their biographies. The biographies include information on their feeding habits, personality traits, and physical features. The winner of the final match-up is named the tournament champion.

The competition is intended to raise awareness, help generate interest in conservation. and give people a chance to engage with wildlife via the webcams.  Evidence of this positive interaction with wildlife can be seen in the fan groups and pages started on social media groups. One such group even began a charity bracket  event organized by Fat Bear fans. The money raised from the buy in  gets donated to a charity chosen by the bracket winner. One such charity was the Katmai Conservancy.

Winners 

In 2022, Bear 747, also known as "Bear Force One", was crowned Fat Bear Champion for the second time. He received 68,105 votes, beating runner-up Bear 901 by 11,229 votes. Given his huge stature, smaller and less aggressive bears rarely confront 747 for prime fishing grounds, allowing him his pick of dining locations which in turn contributes to his weight gain.

References

External links 

 National Park Service - Fat Bear Week

Katmai National Park and Preserve
Annual events